Wind power is a form of renewable energy in Pakistan which makes up more than 6% of the total electricity production in the country. As of 2018, wind power capacity in Pakistan was 1,287 MW. The government is looking to increase the share of renewable energy and plans to add around 3.5 GW of wind energy capacity by 2018.

History
The first practical wind-powered machines, the windmill and the windpump, were invented in what are now Afghanistan, Iran and Pakistan by the 9th century.

Wind corridors
The Pakistan Meteorological Department conducted a study in 2013 entitled "Wind Power Potential Survey of Coastal Areas of Pakistan", which the Ministry of Science & Technology provided funding for. This study enabled PMD to identify potential "wind corridors" where economically feasible wind farm could be established. The Gharo-Jhimpir wind corridor in Sindh was identified as the most lucrative site for wind power plants. The wind power potential covered an area of 9700 km2 with a gross wind power potential of 43000 MW.

Plants

Jhimpir Wind Power Plant 

The Jhimpir Wind Power Plant was developed in Jhimpir, Sindh by Zorlu Energy Pakistan. The total cost of project is $136 million. Completed in 2002, it has a total capacity of 50 MW. This wind Corridor has a 50000 megawatt potential with average wind speeds over 7-meter per second. The government has announced upfront tariff and ROI of 17 per cent which is highest in the world. There are 14 projects in the pipeline out of which 50 MW FFCEL project will achieve COD by mid December 2012.

Foundation Wind Energy I and II 
Fauji Foundation setup two wind projects (50 MW each) at Gharo, Thatta District. The EPC contractors were Nordex and Descon with Nordex as the lead contractor. Foundation Wind Energy II (Private) Limited was commissioned in July 2014. Foundation Wind Energy I (Private) Limited was commissioned on Feb 2015.

Artistic Energy (Pvt) Ltd. 
Artistic Energy (Pvt) Ltd. setup 49.3 MW wind power project in Jhimpir Sindh. The EPC contractor was Hydro-china. Artistic Energy (Pvt) Ltd was commissioned in March 2018. It consists of 29 Wind turbines GE 1.7 MW each, and having hub height of 92m, highest hub height in the region. It supplies power to 220 kV Jhimpir New Grid Station through two 132KV lines, one is Tapal line and other is New Jhimpir line.

Three Gorges First Wind Farm 
Three Gorges First Wind Farm Pakistan has started the operation of 50 MW wind power project on 24 November 2014 at Jhimpir, Sindh. Contract of supply and installation of wind turbines was given to GOLDWIND and EPC contractor in the project was CWE (China International Water & Electric Corporation). TGF is the sister concern of China Three Gorges Corporation (CTG), who have built the world largest dam with the installed capacity of 22500 MW in Yiling District, Yichang, Hubei, China. Three Gorges have also planned to build two more wind power projects of 50 MW each in Jhimphir, Sindh in 2015.

Three Gorges Second Wind Farm Pakistan has started the operation of 50 MW wind power project in 2018 at Jhimpir, Sindh. Contract of supply and installation of wind turbines was given to GOLDWIND.

Sapphire Wind Power Plant 
A 52.8 MW wind power plant attained commercial operation date (COD) in a record time of only 14 months on 22 November 2015. Its availability in RRT (Run Reliability Test) was also a record in Pakistan. Hydro China, a Chinese EPC contractor using 33x1.68 MW GE wind turbines constructed the power plant. SWPCL is the first wind project of General Electric in Pakistan and it was also a first project of Hydrochina. Some $95 million debt financing was secured for the project from Oversees Private Investment Corporation (OPIC), USA. The project is a joint ownership of Sapphire Textile and Bank Alfalah.

Tricon Boston Consulting corporation Wind Power Plant 
Tricon Boston Consulting corporation setup 50 MW * 3 = 150MW wind power project in Jhimpir Sindh. The EPC contractor was Hydro-china International. Tricon Boston was commissioned in 2018. It consists of 87 Wind turbines GE 1.7 MW. It supplies power to 220 kV Jhimpir New Grid Station through two 132KV lines.

ACT Wind Farm 
The ACT wind farm is located at the province of Sindh. HydroChina, a subsidiary of China Power Construction Corporation, is constructing the project. It will be run by three local Pakistani Groups Namely Akhtar, Candyland and Tapal Groups. The deal is for 20 GW82 1.5MW turbine. The machines will be customised to suit the local wind and climate conditions. Shipments will be made at the end of 2015. Installation work is scheduled for completion in the third quarter of 2016.  The plant went live on 7 October 2016.

Metro Power Company Limited 
Metro Power Project, a 50 MW wind power project of Metro Power Company Limited located in Jhimpir, district Thatta, Sindh, achieved financial close on 19 February 2015. The project is expected to achieve commercial operation by August 2016. The initiative in sponsored by Iqbal Ali Mohamed and Family, Infraco Asia Development Pvt Ltd out of Singapore and International Finance Corporation is scheduled to commence operation in third quarter 2016. It is financed by ETDB, National Bank, UBL, Bank Alfalah and Askari Bank.

See also
Renewable energy in Pakistan
Solar power in Pakistan

References

External links
Malaysian firm wins $75m Pakistan wind-power project
Pakistan and US sign 150 megawatt wind power project
www.windpowermonthly.com